Navosoma is a genus of beetles in the family Cerambycidae. It is monotypic, being represented by the single species Navosoma luctuosum.

References

Prioninae